The State Office Building is a 13-story,  high-rise building located in downtown Madison, Wisconsin, United States. The building was built in three separate stages between 1931 and 1959, with the main section being completed in 1939. It is built in an art deco style, and it is the tallest office building in downtown Madison. It was added to the National Register of Historic Places in 1982.

Construction of the building
 The primary facades consist mainly of gray granite masonry cut to size for their particular use.
 The masonry wall construction of the first and main units built lack a water drainage system, albeit typical for their 1930s vintage.

See also
List of tallest buildings in Madison

References

Art Deco architecture in Wisconsin
Skyscrapers in Madison, Wisconsin
Skyscraper office buildings in Wisconsin
Office buildings on the National Register of Historic Places in Wisconsin
National Register of Historic Places in Madison, Wisconsin
Office buildings completed in 1939
1939 establishments in Wisconsin